The First Vogel Ministry was a responsible government which held power in New Zealand from April 1873 to July 1875.

Background
Julius Vogel took office in 1873, William Fox having served in an interim capacity after the resignation of George Waterhouse. The personnel of the Ministry was initially the same as the Fox Ministry, except with the addition of Daniel Pollen leading the Government in the upper house after defecting from the Opposition.  

Mindful of the unsustainability of the logging industry, Vogel promoted a measure to create national forestry reserves, but was frustrated by provincial interests who saw this as an encroachment on the Provincial Councils’ powers over land management. This was the trigger for this former provincialist to announce the abolition of provincial government. The constitutional issue cut across the previous party lines (based on boosting or criticising the management of public works investment) and enabled supporters of Edward Stafford, such as Harry Atkinson, to join the Government. Atkinson was one of the new Government supporters whose caution began to restrain the speed of the public works programme. Another proponent of caution was existing Minister Edward Richardson. However, the abolitionist turn alienated some of Vogel's original supporters: William Reynolds would only support abolition if the land funds were to remain allocated to provincial expenditure, but George O’Rorke wouldn't accept this. He announced his resignation as Minister in the House without informing his Cabinet colleagues. However, O’Rorke had also delivered a “lack-lustre performance” in office. Another provincialist Minister, John Bathgate, threatened to defend Dunedin's custom-house with a company of volunteers - but was induced to join the judiciary instead.

Continuation with the public works and immigration scheme became increasingly difficult as funds had already been committed which had not yet been borrowed on a tightening credit market, so Vogel resigned in 1875 to go to England for another £4 million loan. Daniel Pollen stood in to replace him.

Ministers
The following members served in the Vogel Ministry:

See also
 New Zealand Government

Notes

References

Ministries of Queen Victoria
Governments of New Zealand
1873 establishments in New Zealand
Vogel Ministry
Vogel Ministry